Mirjana Spoljaric Egger is a Swiss diplomat. Since October 2022, she has served as the President of the International Committee of the Red Cross.

Life and work 
Egger studied philosophy, economics and international law at the University of Basel and the University of Geneva. She finished her studies with a master's degree. She then worked as a research assistant at the Faculty of Law of the University of Basel. In 2000, she joined the Federal Department of Foreign Affairs, where she held various positions, including in Bern and New York. From 2004 to 2006, she taught on global governance in the Department of Sociology at the University of Lucerne.

She initially worked at the Swiss Embassy in Cairo and was desk officer for the European Bank for Reconstruction and Development and Nuclear Safety in Central and Eastern Europe. From 2010 to 2012, Egger was posted to Amman as a senior adviser at the office of the UN Commissioner General for the United Nations Relief Agency for Palestinian Refugees and Refugees (UNRWA).

From 2012 to  she was ambassador, head of the Department of United Nations and International Organizations. She represented Switzerland in the negotiations on the UN reforms and the UN budget, in the Security Council, in the General Assembly, in the Economic and Social Council of the United Nations, in the Commission for Peace Consolidation, in the Human Rights Council and in the UN Office for Drugs and Crime.

In November 2021, the Assembly of the International Committee of the Red Cross elected Spoljaric Egger as President of the Committee with effect from 1 October 2022 in place of Peter Maurer. She is the first woman in this office.

References

External links 
 Profile on the ICRC Website

Living people
Red Cross personnel
Swiss diplomats
Year of birth missing (living people)
University of Basel alumni
University of Geneva alumni